The 1978 European Taekwondo Championships were held in Munich, West Germany between October 20 and 22, 1978 under the organization of the European Taekwondo Union (ETU).

Medal table

Medalists

References

External links 
 European Taekwondo Union

1978 in taekwondo
European Taekwondo Championships
International sports competitions hosted by Germany
1978 in European sport
1978 in German sport